is an Archaic Latin phrase meaning "whether god or goddess". It was used to address a deity of unknown gender.

The phrase can be found on several ancient monuments. Archaic Roman inscriptions such as this may have been written to protect the identity of the god if Rome were captured by an enemy. The construction was often used when invoking the god of a place (e.g., "Be you god or goddess who reigns over Carthage, grant us..."). The classical scholar Edward Courtney claimed it was "intended to cover all bases as an acknowledgement of the limitations of human knowledge about divine powers".

Monuments

Altar to the Unknown God

In 1820, an altar was discovered on the Palatine Hill with an Old Latin inscription:

which can be transliterated into the modern form as:

and translated as:

The altar is regarded as a late Roman Republic restoration of an archaic original. In the nineteenth century it was misidentified as a famous altar to Aius Locutius. The real identity of the divinity cannot be known, as it does not specify whether it is a god or a goddess. The praetor Gaius Sextius C. f. Calvinus may have restored an earlier altar reading , or he may have been restoring an altar that had been left to decay, after the god or goddess to whom it had originally been dedicated was forgotten.

Close to the site, four inscribed columns were found dating to the Julio-Claudian period. Column A (now missing) read , or "Father Mars", in Archaic Latin. Column B reads , which possibly means "In Memory of Remus." Column C reads , possibly referring to a goddess named Anabesta, or else to the Greek  ("to go up"), interpreted as a reference to Remus' scaling of the Roman walls. Column D, the longest inscription, reads:

Livy ascribed the institution of the fetiales to Ancus Marcius, and claimed that the  came to Rome from the Aequicoli.

See also
Unknown God

References

Further reading 
 Alvar, Jaime, 1988: "Materiaux pour l'etude de la formule sive deus, sive dea" Numen 32,2, 236-273.

Latin religious words and phrases
Latin inscriptions
Ancient Roman religion